Yurizan Beltrán (November 2, 1986 – December 13, 2017) was an American pornographic actress, model, and mainstream actress. In addition to her successful pornographic and modeling career, Beltran also starred in the 2006 horror film Werewolf in a Women's Prison and later in 2017 the romantic comedy Rice on White.

During her fairly successful pornographic career, Beltran received positive attention from her critics and peers. Over the course of her career, Beltran received multiple high industry award nominations from Adult Video News, NightMoves, XBIZ, and the X-Rated Critics Organization.

On December 18, 2017, she was found dead in her California apartment of an apparent drug overdose.

Career 
Beginning in 2003, Beltran began doing feature modeling and appearances in Southern California as a Hooters girl. In 2005, she began adult modeling when she decided to launch her first website, SweetYurizan.com. In 2006, she appeared in her first mainsteam film a low budget horror film Werewolf in a Women's Prison.

In 2005, Beltran was featured in her first adult film, a non-sex solo performance for JB Video titled Yurizan. In 2006 and 2007, Beltran only modeled, she was featured by Hustler, Playboy, and Penthouse. She was also a covergirl for Lowrider, posing in a gold bikini with a Chevrolet convertible in the magazine's December issue. In 2009, she returned to porn only shooting lesbian, solo or non-sex films. She shot with New Sensations, Reality Kings, Digital Playground, and Twistys.com.

In the 2010 film Big Tits Round Asses 20 by Bang Bros, Beltran made her boy/girl scene debut. In 2011, she was nominated for Best Web Star 28th AVN Awards. Also in 2011, Beltran began working with Brazzers she shot six films with them that year. In 2012, she continued her success and was nominated for Unsung Starlet of the Year at the 29th AVN Awards as well as Best Latina Performer from NightMoves Awards.

At the 30th AVN Awards, Beltran was nominated for Best All-Girl Group Sex Scene for her work in Training Day: a XXX Parody with her co-stars Chanel Preston and Nyomi Banxxx.

In 2017, she played Jade in the romantic comedy film White on Rice directed by Talun Hsu.

Death 
Beltran died of a drug overdose at her apartment in Bellflower, California on December 13, 2017. She was found by her landlord, lying in her bed, beside a spilled pill bottle. After about five months, the LA medical examiner revealed her official cause of death was bronchopneumoniainflammation of the lungscaused by an overdose of the prescription opioid hydrocodone.

The adult studio PornStar Platinum, which Beltran was a part of, set up a GoFundMe page for Beltran's family. The page closed after raising over $9,000 for funeral expenses.

There were a number of other high-profile deaths in the porn industry around the same time: Shyla Stylez died in November 2017; August Ames committed suicide eight days prior to Beltran's death; and in January 2018, Olivia Lua and Olivia Nova died. Their deaths generated discussion regarding whether the adult industry is doing enough for performers’ mental health and focused on the common knowledge that most adult stars are ostracized from much of polite society; while critics of the industry conversely argued how the tragically premature death comported with longstanding trends perhaps evincing, rather, that such negative outcomes could be interpreted as implicit to participation in the industry itself, and thus are not possible to remediate by actionable measures provided by said industry.

Filmography

Film

Television

Partial filmography 
 Not Monday Night Football XXX (2006)
 Ticklicious (2009)
 Big Naturals (2009)
 Fly Girls (2009)
 Thats My Girl (2010)
 We Live Together (2010)
 Inside Story (2010)

See also 
 List of pornographic performers by decade
 List of pornographic actors who appeared in mainstream films

References

External links 
 Official website
 
 
 

1986 births
2017 deaths
People from Los Angeles
American pornographic film actresses
Deaths by heroin overdose in California
21st-century American women
Deaths from bronchopneumonia